The 1942–43 season was the 44th season in the history of Berner Sport Club Young Boys. The team played their home games at Stadion Wankdorf in Bern.

Overview
Young Boys achieved a fourth place finish in the Nationalliga and reached the quarter-finals of the Swiss Cup where they lost to FC Locarno.

Players
 Maurice Glur
 Achille Siegrist
 Louis Gobet
 Hans Flühmann
 Hans Liniger
 Ernst Siegenthaler
 Willy Terretaz
 Bernard Lanz
 Hans Blaser
 Willy Bernhard
 Ramseyer

Competitions

Overall record

Nationalliga

League table

Matches

Swiss Cup

References

BSC Young Boys seasons
Swiss football clubs 1942–43 season